French Polynesia elects the Assembly of French Polynesia (Assemblée de la Polynésie française), the unicameral legislature on the territorial level. The Assembly of French Polynesia has 57 members, elected for a five-year term by proportional representation in multi-seat constituencies. 
French Polynesia has a two-party system, which means that there are two dominant political parties, with extreme difficulty for anybody to achieve electoral success under the banner of any other party.

In June 2011, the electoral law will likely be changed again, with a two-round proportional system including a bonus of a third of the seats for the winning list in the second round, with the rest of the seats distributed proportionally; the electoral threshold to advance to the second round will be 12.5%.

Last elections

2004 elections

The elections in 2004 produced a close result leading to unstable majorities in the assembly.  In addition, the election was invalidated in districts in Tahiti and Moorea, causing by-elections in 37 out of 57 seats.

2007 elections
On September 14, 2007, Oscar Temaru, 63, was elected president of French Polynesia for the 3rd time in 3 years (with 27 of 44 votes cast in Tahiti assembly). He replaced former President Gaston Tong Sang, who lost a no-confidence vote in the 31 August parliament.

2008 elections

In the elections on January 27 and February 10, 2008, the To Tatou Ai'a (Our Land) party led by Gaston Tong Sang, Mayor of Bora Bora, won 29 seats out of the 66 possible but not the overall majority. The Union for Democracy (Union pour la Démocratie) which included Oscar Temaru's pro-independence Tavini Huiraatira gained 20 seats. A surprise coalition between old enemies Gaston Flosse (Tahoera'a Huiraatira, 10 seats) and Temaru saw once again the election of Flosse as President of French Polynesia.

See also
 Electoral calendar
 Electoral system

References